Oslešica is a former settlement in the Municipality of Šentjur in eastern Slovenia. It is now part of the village of Loka pri Žusmu. The area is part of the traditional region of Styria. The municipality is now included in the Savinja Statistical Region.

Geography
Oslešica lies in the hills south of the village center of Loka pri Žusmu. It is a scattered settlement along the headwaters of Virštanj Creek below the Rudnica Ridge, which stands to the northeast. Before it was annexed, it included the hamlets of Grmada, Javoršica, and Zavrečnica; these are all part of Loka pri Žusmu today.

History
Oslešica was annexed by Loka pri Žusmu in 1953, ending its existence as an independent settlement.

References

External links
Oslešica at Geopedia

Populated places in the Municipality of Šentjur
Former settlements in Slovenia